Auratonota polymaculata is a species of moth of the family Tortricidae. It is found in Ecuador.

The wingspan is about 36 mm. The ground colour of the forewings is brownish cream, but brownish along the termen and tinged pale ferruginous between markings. The colour is cream along blotches and spots. The hindwings are brown.

Etymology
The specific name refers to a number of costal spots on the forewings and is derived from Greek poly (meaning numerous) and Latin maculata (meaning spotted).

References

Moths described in 2008
Auratonota
Moths of South America